Cameron Clark (born September 16, 1991) is an American professional basketball player for the San Miguel Beermen of the Philippine Basketball Association (PBA).

College career
In his senior season at Oklahoma, Clark averaged career-highs of 15.6 points and 5.5 rebounds per game and shot 46.2 percent from the floor, a team-high 43.5 percent from behind the arc, and 79.8 percent from the foul line. He helped lead Oklahoma to a 23–10 overall record, a second place mark in the Big 12 Conference with a 12–6 conference record, and a five seed in the NCAA Tournament. The 19th leading scorer all-time at Oklahoma with 1,284 points, Clark was named to the Third Team All-Big 12 after the season. He participated in the 2014 Reese's Division I College All-Star Game during Final Four weekend.

Professional career
After going undrafted in the 2014 NBA draft, Clark joined the Los Angeles Clippers in the 2014 NBA Summer League.

On July 24, 2014, he inked his first pro contract with Vanoli Cremona of Serie A, the top Italian league.

Clark joined the Milwaukee Bucks for the 2015 Summer League. On September 7, 2015, Clark signed a one-year deal with Ironi Nahariya.

On July 17, 2017, Clark signed with Turkish club Gaziantep Basketbol. However, he missed much of the year with an injury.

Clark inked with the French club Le Mans Sarthe Basket on August 29, 2018.

On July 19, 2019, Clark signed a one-year contract with Bahçeşehir Koleji of the Turkish Basketbol Süper Ligi (BSL).

On February 19, 2021, he signed with ratiopharm Ulm of the Basketball Bundesliga.

On October 17, 2021, he signed with EWE Baskets Oldenburg of the Basketball Bundesliga (BBL).

On March 3, 2022, he signed with the NLEX Road Warriors of the Philippine Basketball Association (PBA) for the 2021 PBA Governors' Cup as a replacement for K. J. McDaniels.

In January 2023, Clark returned to the Philippines as he signed with the San Miguel Beermen of the Philippine Basketball Association (PBA) as the team's import for the 2023 PBA Governors' Cup.

References

External links

1991 births
Living people
American expatriate basketball people in France
American expatriate basketball people in Germany
American expatriate basketball people in Israel
American expatriate basketball people in Italy
American expatriate basketball people in the Philippines
American expatriate basketball people in Turkey
American expatriate basketball people in Uruguay
American men's basketball players
Bahçeşehir Koleji S.K. players
Basketball players from Phoenix, Arizona
Basketball players from Texas
Élan Chalon players
EWE Baskets Oldenburg players
Ironi Nahariya players
Le Mans Sarthe Basket players
NLEX Road Warriors players
Oklahoma Sooners men's basketball players
People from Sherman, Texas
Philippine Basketball Association imports
ratiopharm Ulm players
San Miguel Beermen players
Sherman High School (Texas) alumni
Small forwards
Vanoli Cremona players